, better known by his stage name , is a Japanese actor and voice actor from Tokyo. He is affiliated with Amuleto. He is best known dubbing roles for Vin Diesel, Dwayne Johnson and many more.

Biography

Filmography

Television animation
1995
Lupin III: The Pursuit of Harimao's Treasure (Harimao)

1996
Kochira Katsushika-ku Kamearikouen-mae Hashutsujo (Electrode Spark)

1999
Lupin III: The Columbus Files (Rosalia's Father)
Weekly Story Land (Robbery, Prisoner)
Bikkuriman 2000 (Bag Y Yaa, Chiensou)

2000
Doki Doki Densetsu Mahoujin Guru Guru (Sly)
Transformers: Robots in Disguise (Black Convoy)

2001
PaRappa the Rapper (Paul Ep.2))Banner of the Stars II (Dokufu)

2002Tokyo Underground (Heat)Whistle! (Sayuju Matsushita)Shin Megami Tensei Devil Children: Light & Dark (Azrael)

2003The Prince of Tennis (Gen'ichirou Sanada)Naruto (Gantetsu, Ibiki Morino)Transformers: Armada (Rad's Father)Tank Knights Portriss (Golda)PoPoLoCrois (Gaude)Gunslinger Girl (Marcello)

2004SD Gundam Force (Epyon, Evil Warrior)Shura no Toki: Age of Chaos (Hijikata Toshizou, Kuki Kazuma, Sanada Yukimura)Yu-Gi-Oh! Duel Monster GX (Don Zaloog)Mobile Suit Gundam Seed Destiny (Alliance Soldier (Ep. 2), Assistant General (Ep. 34), Atlantic Alliance President (Eps. 6, 9), Car Leader (Ep. 18), Herbert von Reinhardt, Logos (Ep. 5), Madd Aves, Mine Guard (Ep. 31), Orb Soldier (Eps. 28, 30), President Joseph Copeland, Shinn's, Father (Eps. 1, 8))Meine Liebe (Headmaster)

2005Xenosaga: The Animation (Margulis)Transformers: Cybertron (Galaxy Convoy)Eyeshield 21 (Mamoru Banba, Onihei Yamamoto)Idaten Jump (Captain)

2006Meine Liebe (Headmaster)Ergo Proxy (Al)Digimon Data Squad (Rentarou Satsuma)Kiba (Tasker)Black Lagoon (Boris)Demashitaa! Powerpuff Girls Z (Professor Utonium Kitazawa)Black Lagoon: The Second Barrage (Boris)Souten no Ken (Charles de Guise)Venus to Mamoru (Soshi Kikukawa)

2007Bleach (Edorad Leones, Zommari Leroux)Naruto Shippuden (Ibiki Morino)Darker than Black (Lebanon)Moribito: Guardian of the Spirit (Casual Kimono)Zero no Tsukaima: Futatsuki no Kishi (Mennovil)Shigurui: Death Frenzy (Hyouma Funaki)Baccano! (Elean Douger)Lupin III: The Last Job (Takaya's Father)Kaiji (Espoir Blacksuit)Dragonaut: The Resonance (Kō Yonamine)MapleStory (Gallus)Hatara Kizzu Maihamu Gumi (Daiki)

2008
 Zenryoku Usagi (President)
 Yu-Gi-Oh! 5D's (Bolt Tanner)
 Neo Angelique Abyss (Mathias)
 Golgo 13 (Sabine Brother Younger)
 Battle Spirits: Shōnen Toppa Bashin (Kyuusaku Kujō/Number Nine)
 One Outs (Dennis Johnson)
 Stitch! (Tachitchu)

2009Sgt. Frog (Trunks/Boxers)The Beast Player Erin (Taikou)Lupin III vs. Detective Conan (Kyle)Phantom: Requiem for the Phantom (Tony Stone)Dragon Ball Z Kai (Nail)Darker than Black: Gemini of the Meteor (Lebanon)Welcome to Irabu's Office (Drama Stage Director)One Piece (Urouge)

2010Battle Spirits: Shōnen Gekiha Dan (Heliostom)Heartcatch Precure! (Professor Sabaaku)Giant Killing (Yotaro Natsuki)Beyblade: Metal Masters (Argo Gracy)Squid Girl (Yūta's Father)

2011Tiger & Bunny (Antonio Lopez/Rock Bison)Beyblade: Metal Fury (Argo Gracy)Nura: Rise of the Yokai Clan: Demon Capital (Gashadokuro)Battle Spirits: Heroes (Mahiru Hinobori)Horizon in the Middle of Nowhere (Tadatsugu Sakai)

2012Sket Dance (Yabuta)The Prince of Tennis II (Gen'ichirō Sanada)Gon (Sword)Zetman (Black Suit B)Kingdom (Mou Bu)Chōyaku Hyakunin Isshu: Uta Koi (Fujiwara no Michitaka)Horizon in the Middle of Nowhere II (Tadatsugu Sakai)Code:Breaker (Baba)

2013The Unlimited: Hyōbu Kyōsuke (Allen Walsh)Beast Saga (Liogre)Kingdom 2 (Mou Bu)Hunter × Hunter (2011) (Morel Mackernasey)Love Lab (Masanobu Maki)Yowamushi Pedal (Scary People)Galilei Donna (Roberto Materrazzi)Lupin III: Princess of the Breeze (Koshare)

2014Baby Steps (Coach Yusaku Miura)Gonna be the Twin-Tail!! (Flea Guildy)A Good Librarian Like a Good Shepherd (Nanai)One Piece (Rolling Logan)

2015Assassination Classroom (Red Eye)Baby Steps Season 2 (Coach Yusaku Miura)The Heroic Legend of Arslan (Bahadur)The Testament of Sister New Devil Burst (Gald)

2016Mobile Suit Gundam: Iron-Blooded Orphans (Sandoval Reuters)Kuromukuro (Sebastian)ClassicaLoid (Bach)

2018Hitori no Shita: The Outcast Season 2 (Riku Kin)

2019Mob Psycho 100 II (Banshomaru Shinra)YU-NO: A Girl Who Chants Love at the Bound of this World (Kōzō Ryūzōji)Fire Force (Leonard Burns)Kochoki: Wakaki Nobunaga (Oda Nobuhide)Food Wars! Shokugeki no Soma: The Fourth Plate (Tosuke Megishima)Demon Slayer: Kimetsu no Yaiba (Rokuro)

2020Fire Force 2nd Season (Leonard Burns)

2021Beastars Season 2 (Ibuki)86 (Reff Adleheit)How a Realist Hero Rebuilt the Kingdom (Georg Carmine)Edens Zero (Drakken Joe)Blade Runner: Black Lotus (Marlowe)

2022Tokyo 24th Ward (Gori Suidō)

2023Malevolent Spirits (Kai)Vinland Saga Season 2 (Thorgil)Sorcerous Stabber Orphen: Chaos in Urbanrama (Damian)Bullbuster (Ginnosuke Mutō)

OVAFinal Fantasy VII Advent Children (2005) (Rude)

ONANinjala (2020) (Van's Father)Hanma Baki - Son of Ogre (2021) (Deputy Warden Samuel)
 Tiger & Bunny 2 (2022) (Antonio Lopez/Rock Bison)Tekken: Bloodline (Heihachi Mishima)

Film animationThe Empire of Corpses (2015) (Frederick Gustavus Burnaby)Detective Conan: Sunflowers of Inferno (2015) (Zengo Gotō)Promare (2019) (Vulcan Haestus)Kukuriraige: Sanxingdui Fantasy (Cancelled)

TokusatsuTokumei Sentai Go-Busters the Movie: Protect the Tokyo Enetower! (2012) (Steamloid)Shuriken Sentai Ninninger (2015) (Substitution Ninja Mujina (ep. 31 - 32))

Drama CDs

 7 Seeds (Tosei Yanagi)
 Abazure (Ichirou Souryuu)
 Mainichi Seiten! series 1 (Taiga Obinata)
 Mainichi Seiten! series 2: Kodomo wa Tomaranai (Taiga Obinata)
 Second Serenade Usagigari (Touyama)

Video gamesApe Escape series (xxxx-xx) (The Pipotron Brothers, Pipotron Creator, Pipotron G, Pipotron Kuratsuku, Pipotron Meta)Call of Duty: Modern Warfare 3 (xxxx, Japanese dub) (Truck)Dynasty Warriors 8 (2013) (Lu Su) (including Xtreme Legends)Genshin Impact (2020) (Andrius)Guilty Gear -STRIVE- (2021) (Nagoriyuki)Dynasty Warriors 9 (2018) (Lu Su)Hyrule Warriors (2014) (Ganondorf)Neo Angelique Abyss (xxxx) (Mathias)Sonic the Hedgehog series (2003–present) (E-123 Omega)Valkyrie Profile 2: Silmeria (xxxx) (Gabriel Celesta)Vampire Hunter D (xxxx) (Machira)Wild Arms 4 (2005) (Hugo Hewitt)Summon Night 4 (2006) (Sector)Crysis (2007, Japanese dub) (Nomad)SD Gundam GGenerations Spirits (2007) (Lt. Ken Bederstadt)Infinite Undiscovery (2008) (Balbagan)Knack (2013) (Knack)Knack 2 (2016) (Knack)The King of Fighters World (2018) (Original Zero, Clone Zero)Overwatch (2018) (Soldier: 76)Bloodstained: Ritual of the Night (2018) (Alfred)Saint Seiya Awakening  (2019) (Jango)The King of Fighters All Star (2019) (Original Zero)Final Fantasy VII Remake (2020) (Rude)Warriors Orochi 4 (2018) (Lu Su)Xenoblade Chronicles 3 (2022) (Cammuravi)Arknights (2022) (Sharp)Cardfight!! Vanguard Dear Days (2022) (Gosetsu Katsushika)Crisis Core: Final Fantasy VII Reunion (2022) (Rude)

Dubbing
Voice-double
Dwayne JohnsonWalking Tall – Christopher "Chris" Vaughn, Jr.The Game Plan – Joe KingmanGet Smart – Agent 23Race to Witch Mountain – Jack BrunoFaster – James CullenTooth Fairy – Derek ThompsonG.I. Joe: Retaliation – RoadblockSnitch – John MatthewsPain & Gain – Paul DoyleEmpire State – Detective James RansoneHercules – HerculesSan Andreas – Chief Raymond "Ray" GainesJumanji: Welcome to the Jungle – Dr. Smolder BravestoneRampage – Davis OkoyeSkyscraper – William SawyerJumanji: The Next Level – Dr. Smolder BravestoneFighting with My Family – The RockRed Notice – John HartleyDC League of Super-Pets – KryptoBlack Adam – Teth-Adam / Black Adam
Vin DieselA Man Apart – DEA Agent Sean VetterFast & Furious – Dominic TorettoFast Five – Dominic TorettoFast & Furious 6 – Dominic TorettoFurious 7 – Dominic TorettoThe Last Witch Hunter – KaulderBilly Lynn's Long Halftime Walk – ShroomThe Fate of the Furious – Dominic TorettoBloodshot – Ray Garrison / BloodshotF9 – Dominic Toretto
Dave BautistaMaster Z: Ip Man Legacy – Owen DavidsonEscape Plan 2: Hades – Trent DeRosaEscape Plan: The Extractors – Trent DeRosaStuber – Victor ManningRunning Wild with Bear Grylls – Dave BautistaArmy of the Dead – Scott WardArmy of Thieves – Scott WardGlass Onion: A Knives Out Mystery – Duke Cody
Jamie FoxxShade – Larry JenningsDue Date – Darryl JohnsonDjango Unchained – Django FreemanSleepless – Vincent DownsRobin Hood – Little JohnProject Power – ArtDay Shift – Bud Jablonski
Tyrese Gibson2 Fast 2 Furious – Roman PearceFlight of the Phoenix – A.J.Four Brothers – Angel MercerAnnapolis – Midshipman 1st Class Matthew ColeThe Take – Adell BaldwinMorbius – Simon Stroud
Adewale Akinnuoye-AgbajeThe Mummy Returns (2005 TV Asahi edition) – Lock-NahLost – Mr. EkoG.I. Joe: The Rise of Cobra – Hershel DaltonAnnie – NashPompeii – Atticus
Idris ElbaRocknRolla – MumblesTakers – Gordon Thomas "G" CozierPrometheus – JanekThe Mountain Between Us – Dr. Ben Bass
Mahershala AliThe Hunger Games: Mockingjay – Part 1 – BoggsThe Hunger Games: Mockingjay – Part 2 – BoggsMoonlight – Juan

Live–action12 Rounds – Danny Fisher (John Cena)25th Hour – Frank Slaugherty (Barry Pepper)28 Days Later – Mark (Noah Huntley)Across the Universe – Jo-Jo (Martin Luther McCoy)Arena – Kaden / The Executioner (Johnny Messner)Armageddon (2004 NTV edition) – A.J. Frost (Ben Affleck)Avatar: The Way of Water – Tonowari (Cliff Curtis)Bacurau – Pacote / Acacio (Thomas Aquino)Behind Enemy Lines – Burnett (Owen Wilson)Below – Steven Coors (Scott Foley)Big Game – Secret Service Agent Morris (Ray Stevenson)Blades of Glory – Charles "Chazz" Michael Michaels (Will Ferrell)Bleeding Steel – Andre (Callan Mulvey)The Bourne Identity – The Professor (Clive Owen)Bright – Nick Jakoby (Joel Edgerton)Broken City – Carl Fairbanks (Jeffrey Wright)Bumblebee – Jack Burns (John Cena)The Cloverfield Paradox – Jason Kiel (David Oyelowo)Cowboy Bebop – Jet Black (Mustafa Shakir)The Crazies – David Dutten (Timothy Olyphant)CSI: NY – Sheldon Hawkes (Hill Harper)The Dark Knight – Gambol (Michael Jai White)Dawn of the Dead – Andre (Mekhi Phifer)Die Another Day – Tang Ling Zao (Rick Yune)Don't Let Go – Detective Jack Radcliff (David Oyelowo)Dr. Dolittle 3 – Bo (Walker Howard)Dreamcatcher – Henry Devlin (Thomas Jane)ER – Dr. Gregory Pratt (Mekhi Phifer)Empire – Lucious Lyon (Terrence Howard)Eragon – Ajihad (Djimon Hounsou)Evolution – Professor Harry Phineas Block (Orlando Jones)Fantastic Four (2008 NTV edition) – Victor Von Doom / Doctor Doom (Julian McMahon)FBI: Most Wanted – Jess LaCroix (Julian McMahon)Final Destination 2 – Eugene Dix (Terrence C. Carson)Focus – Nicky Spurgeon (Will Smith)The Foreigner – Mr. Mimms (Sherman Augustus)Gangster Squad – Sergeant John O'Mara (Josh Brolin)Ghost Ship – Greer (Isaiah Washington)Go Fast – Lucien (Jil Milan)The Godfather (2008 Blu-Ray/DVD editions) – Virgil Sollozzo (Al Lettieri)Honey – Chaz (Mekhi Phifer)Iron Sky – Klaus Adler (Götz Otto)The Island – Albert Laurent (Djimon Hounsou)John Q. – Tuck Lampley (Paul Johansson)Killing Eve – Jamie (Danny Sapani)King Kong – Benjamin "Ben" Hayes (Evan Parke)Ladder 49 – Tommy Drake (Morris Chestnut)Lincoln Rhyme: Hunt for the Bone Collector – Lincoln Rhyme (Russell Hornsby)The Marine 6: Close Quarters – Luke Trapper (Shawn Michaels)The Matrix Reloaded – Captain Ballard (Roy Jones Jr.), Captain Soren (Steve Bastoni)Minority Report – Danny Witwer (Colin Farrell)Mortal Engines – Chudleigh Pomeroy (Colin Salmon)The Neon Demon – Hank (Keanu Reeves)O – Odin James (Mekhi Phifer)The O.C. – Sandy Cohen (Peter Gallagher)Obi-Wan Kenobi – Darth Vader (James Earl Jones)The Originals – Elijah Mikaelson (Daniel Gillies)P.S. I Love You – Gerry Kennedy (Gerard Butler)Paycheck (2008 TV Asahi edition) – Michael Jennings (Ben Affleck)Playing with Fire – Jake "Supe" Carson (John Cena)The Possession – Clyde Brenek (Jeffrey Dean Morgan)Project ALF – Dexter Moyers (Miguel Ferrer)Proven Innocent – Ezekiel "EZ" Boudreau (Russell Hornsby)The Purge – James Sandin (Ethan Hawke)Rachel Getting Married – Sidney (Tunde Adebimpe)Ready Player One – Nolan Sorrento / IOI–655321 (Ben Mendelsohn)Reign of Fire – Creedy (Gerard Butler)Reign Over Me – Dr. Alan Johnson (Don Cheadle)River Queen – Wiremu (Cliff Curtis)The Rock (1999 NTV edition) – Private McCoy (Steve Harris)Rogue One – Darth Vader (James Earl Jones)S. Darko – Justin Sparrow (James Lafferty)Santa's Slay – Santa (Bill Goldberg)Scarface (2004 DVD edition) – Manny Ribera (Steven Bauer)Selma – Martin Luther King Jr. (David Oyelowo)Shazam! – Victor Vasquez (Cooper Andrews)Shazam! Fury of the Gods – Victor Vasquez (Cooper Andrews)Shock Wave – Hung Kai-pang (Jiang Wu)Snatch – Sol (Lennie James)The Sopranos – Silvio Dante (Steven Van Zandt)Space Jam: A New Legacy – LeBron JamesSpell – Marquis T. Woods (Omari Hardwick)Starship Troopers 3: Marauder – General Dix Hauser (Boris Kodjoe)Straight Outta Compton – Lorenzo "MC Ren" Patterson (Aldis Hodge)Thor: Ragnarok – Skurge (Karl Urban)Top Gun (2005 NTV edition) – LTJG Ron "Slider" Kerner (Rick Rossovich)Top Gun: Maverick – Solomon "Warlock" Bates (Charles Parnell)Torque – Trey Wallace (Ice Cube)Trance – Nate (Danny Sapani)Transformers – JazzTrespass – Elias (Ben Mendelsohn)Vinyl – Zak Yankovich (Ray Romano)Virus (2002 NTV edition) – Richie Mason (Sherman Augustus)Warcraft – Durotan (Toby Kebbell)When in Rome – Lance (Jon Heder)Woodlawn – Coach Tandy Gerelds (Nicholas Bishop)X-Men: Days of Future Past – Lucas Bishop (Omar Sy)XXX – Kolya (Petr Jákl)Zoey's Extraordinary Playlist – Mitch Clarke (Peter Gallagher)

AnimatedIsle of Dogs (Chief)Love, Death & Robots (Sergeant Nielson)Surf's Up (Tank "The Shredder" Evans)Surf's Up 2: WaveMania (Tank "The Shredder" Evans)Wreck-It Ralph'' (M. Bison)

References

External links
  
 
 

1967 births
Living people
Japanese male video game actors
Japanese male voice actors
Male voice actors from Tokyo
20th-century Japanese male actors
21st-century Japanese male actors